Dr. John Haase (August 21, 1923 – August 3, 2006) was an American dentist and author whose most well-known novel was adapted into the 1968 Richard Lester film Petulia starring George C. Scott and Julie Christie.

Life
Haase was born in Frankfurt, Germany, the only son of a Lutheran father and Jewish mother. The growing threat of Nazi power forced the family to migrate to San Francisco in 1936.

He graduated from the University of California, Los Angeles, and then studied at the Dental School of the University of San Francisco. He enlisted during World War II, and served in the Army in Texas.

Haase practiced in the Westwood section of Los Angeles, with many celebrities, including Conrad Hilton, for clients, for nearly 40 years.

He married Jean Rosenblatt in 1948. They had four children, but the marriage ended in divorce. In 1975, he wed Janis.

He died in Montecito, California, of complications arising out of emphysema.

Haase as author
His first novel, The Young Who Sin, appeared in 1958.

Me and the Arch Kook Petulia takes a searingly satirical look at the America of the 1960s. It is the story of an affair between a middle-aged doctor, in the midst of a divorce, and a self-described kook who wants to have an affair because she has been married for six months and has not had one yet. Haase was not happy with the adaptation for screen. However the release of Lester's film was greeted with acclaim. The New York Times, commenting in July 2006 on a DVD collection of comedies from the 1960s and 1970s, called Petulia the most notable of a group of groundbreaking films from the 1960s.

Erasmus with Freckles features Erasmus Leaf, who nurses a crush for Brigitte Bardot, and his father, an absent-minded poet with a distaste for science, who has to deal with the mathematical genius that his son demonstrates.

Big Red, a historical novel, describes the construction of the Hoover Dam in the early 1930s. The title refers to the Colorado River, although the appellation is not well recognized among locales. Haase had in mind, from personal chats, to produce a book that could be compared to Steinbeck's Grapes of Wrath; unfortunately, the novel was not well-received. Much of its local geography is based upon the research of a geographer, who engaged in fieldwork in Haase's behalf.

Haase was a prolific travel writer too, with several articles appearing in magazines and newspapers.

He also wrote an episode of the Richard Boone Show on in 1963, titled The Wall to Wall War.

Bibliography
 The Young Who Sin (1958)
 Road Show (1960)
 The Fun Couple (1961, made into a play of the same name)
 The Sherbert Colours (1963)
 Erasmus with Freckles (1963; made into the film Dear Brigitte, 1965)
 Me and the Arch Kook Petulia (1966; made into the film Petulia, 1968)
 The Noon Balloon to Rangoon (1967)
 The Nuptials (1969)
 Seasons and Moments (1971)
 Big Red (1980)
 San Francisco (1983)
 "A Boy's Rite of Passage Out of Nazi Germany" (article in the Los Angeles Times, 1984)

Trivia
 He married Janis aboard a cruise ship in San Pedro, California, with the band (friends of Haase) Van Halen performing dockside.
 "The first draft was better than the book...(the later screenwriter) wrote about a world I'd never known existed, and if it does, I'd strongly suggest he keep it to himself." - Haase writing about the screen adaptation of his novel Me and the Arch Kook Petulia in the Los Angeles Times in 1967
 "Adapting a brilliant dentist's charming novel to the screen was like pulling teeth." - Dear Brigitte screenwriter Hal Kanter in the Los Angeles Times in 1964.

References

1923 births
2006 deaths
Deaths from emphysema
20th-century American novelists
American dentists
University of San Francisco alumni
American male novelists
20th-century American male writers
20th-century dentists
German emigrants to the United States
University of California, Los Angeles alumni
United States Army personnel of World War II